Saatluy-e Beyglar (also Romanized as Sā‘atlūy-e Beyglar; also known as Sā‘atlū-ye Beyglar) is a village in Nazlu-e Shomali Rural District, Nazlu District, Urmia County, West Azerbaijan Province, Iran. At the 2006 census, its population was 675, in 196 families.

References 

Populated places in Urmia County